"Brothers" is a song by American rapper Kanye West, featuring American singer Charlie Wilson.

Background
7 Aurelius first produced the song while playing his keyboard in 2016 and got Chris Stylez to sing demo vocals over the track.

In November 2017, Irv Gotti hinted on Instagram that he was working on "something enormous" with Kanye West. West altered "Brothers" to create "Violent Crimes", the final track from West's album Ye (2018).

On June 5, 2019, Irv Gotti stated in an interview on The Breakfast Club that the season 2 premiere of his show Tales would "be a two-hour season premiere of a brand new record produced by me and my production partner Seven from a huge, huge, huge artist." Gotti stated the artist was from the Midwest and that he's "the biggest, hugest artist who's been the most controversial in the last year." DJ Envy responded with "Ok, Kanye West is gonna be on the season premiere of Tales", to which Irv Gotti replied "I didn't say it! But let's say it right. He's not acting in it, but maybe I have a song ... Envy is a fucking genius!"

Release and promotion

The song debuted with the season 2 premiere of the show Tales on July 2, 2019. The following day, the demo of the track, featuring vocals from Chris Stylez, was released on Seven's website. West's manager stated that their team didn't want the song to be commercially released as it would affect the promotion for his upcoming album Yandhi.

Personnel
Credits adapted from Tales season 2 episode 1 and Forbes.
 Kanye West – lead vocals, production
 Charlie Wilson – featured vocals
 Seven – production
 Irv Gotti – production
 Bink! – co-production
 Genesis the Greykid – cover art

Notes

References

Unreleased songs
Charlie Wilson (singer) songs
Kanye West songs
Song recordings produced by Irv Gotti
Songs written by Channel 7 (musician)
2019 songs
Songs written by Irv Gotti